KOEG (88.3 FM) in Walters is a radio station broadcasting a Catholic religious format. The station is owned by Oklahoma Catholic Broadcasting, Inc.

History
This station was assigned call sign KOEG on September 4, 2009.

References

External links
 
 http://okcr.org/

Radio stations established in 2009
OEG
2009 establishments in Oklahoma
Catholic Church in Oklahoma
Cotton County, Oklahoma